Junik is a municipality located in the District of Gjakova in western Kosovo. According to the 2011 census, the town of Junik had 6,053 inhabitants, while the municipality had 6,084 inhabitants.

It is located between Deçan and Gjakova along mountainous border with Albania. It is populated with ethnic Albanians. Junik is the hometown of several prominent people including former heavyweight European boxing champion Luan Krasniqi and poet Din Mehmeti.

History

Middle Ages
During the Ottoman occupation of the Balkans, Junik and the Municipality of Junik were part of the Nahiya of Altun-ili during the 15th century. In the 15th century, around half of Junik's population had typical Albanian anthroponomy. During the early period of Ottoman occupation, Gjakova and the Gjakova Municipality were part of the Nahiya of Altun-ili. Most of the villages in the Nahiya of Altun-ili were dominated by inhabitants with Albanian anthroponomy, which indicates that during the 15th century (as supported by Ottoman defters), the lands between Junik and Gjakova were inhabited by a dominant ethnic Albanian majority.

Settlements
 Junik
 Jasiq-Gjocaj

Demographics
Pursuant to the statistical data from the year 1981 and some estimations by the municipality and local registrations that followed the 1999 conflict, it is assumed that the municipality had approximately 12,500 inhabitants during the 1990s. According to the 2011 census results, the municipality has 6,084 inhabitants.

Apart from one Muslim Slav family, the municipality is monoethnic Albanian.

Economy 
The economy of Junik is based on agriculture. Almost all inhabitants are involved in agricultural activities. As in the rest of Kosovo, unemployment is a problem. However, after the 1999 conflict, there was an increase in registrations of private businesses and currently more than 50 businesses are registered. Most of the enterprises are family-run, especially trade enterprises. The municipal administration is currently the largest employer. The inhabitants see the forests around Junik and its natural environment as assets of the municipality and the administration is seeking possibilities in the development of tourism.

Notable people 
 Luan Krasniqi
 Rexhep Goçi
 Robin Krasniqi
 Edmond Hoxha
 Din Mehmeti
 Ali Jasiqi, a writer

See also 
 District of Gjakova
 Neutral Zone of Junik

Notes

References

External links 

 Municipality of Junik

Municipalities of Kosovo